Meet the Parents is a 2000 American comedy film written by Jim Herzfeld and John Hamburg and directed by Jay Roach. It chronicles a series of unfortunate events that befall a good-hearted but hapless nurse (Ben Stiller as Greg Focker) while visiting his girlfriend's parents (Robert De Niro as Jack Byrnes and Blythe Danner as Dina Byrnes). Teri Polo as Pam Byrnes and Owen Wilson as Kevin Rawley also star.

The film is a remake of a 1992 film of the same name directed by Greg Glienna and produced by Jim Vincent. Glienna – who also played the original film's protagonist – and Mary Ruth Clarke cowrote the screenplay. Universal Pictures purchased the rights to Glienna's film with the intent of creating a new version. Jim Herzfeld expanded the original script but development was halted for some time. Jay Roach read the expanded script and expressed his desire to direct it but Universal declined him. At that time, Steven Spielberg was interested in doing so while Jim Carrey was interested in playing the lead role. The studio only offered the film to Roach once Spielberg and Carrey left the project.

Released in the United States and Canada on October 6, 2000 and distributed by Universal Pictures, the film earned back its initial budget of $55 million in only 11 days. It went on to become one of the highest-grossing films of 2000, earning over $165 million in North America and over $330 million worldwide. It was well received by film critics and viewers alike, winning several awards and earning additional nominations. Ben Stiller won two comedy awards for his performance and the film was chosen as the Favorite Comedy Motion Picture at the 2001 People's Choice Awards. The success of the film inspired two sequels, namely Meet the Fockers and Little Fockers released in 2004 and 2010, respectively. It also inspired a reality television show titled Meet My Folks and a sitcom titled In-Laws, both of which debuted on NBC in 2002.

Plot
Greg Focker, a nurse living in Chicago, intends to propose to his girlfriend, Pam Byrnes, but his plan is disrupted when they are invited to the wedding of Pam's sister, Debbie, at their parents' house on Long Island. Greg decides to impress Pam's parents first, and propose to her in front of her family, but this plan is put on hold when the airline company loses his luggage which contains the engagement ring.

At the Byrnes's house, Greg meets Pam's father Jack, her mother Dina, and their beloved cat Jinx. Despite maintaining a friendly demeanor towards Greg, Jack is immediately suspicious of him and is critical for his choice of career as a male nurse and anything else he sees as a difference between Greg and the Byrnes family. Greg attempts to impress Jack, but his efforts fail. He becomes even more uncomfortable after he receives an impromptu lie detector test from Jack and later learns from Pam that Jack is a retired CIA operative who interrogated double agents.

Meeting the rest of Pam's family and friends, Greg still feels like an outsider. Despite efforts to impress her family, his inadvertent actions make him an easy target for ridicule. Greg unintentionally gives Debbie a broken nose and a black eye during a pool volleyball game, uses a malfunctioning toilet which floods the backyard with sewage, spills Jack's mother's ashes while opening a champagne bottle, and sets the wedding altar on fire. Several misunderstandings cause Jack to believe Greg is a marijuana user after Pam's weed-using brother, Denny, implicitly frames him. Later, Greg loses Jinx and replaces him with a stray, whose tail he spray-paints and who makes a mess of the house, including destroying Debbie's wedding dress (though the real Jinx is later found). By now, the entire Byrnes family, including Pam, agrees that Greg should leave Long Island, while Jack accuses Greg of lying about being a nurse and taking the Medical College Admission Test because his CIA contacts could not find any record of a "Gregory" Focker. Desperate to save himself, Greg reveals he has seen Jack engaging in some secret activity with some shady characters, and that Jack is planning a covert mission after the wedding, only for Jack to angrily reveal that the mission was a surprise honeymoon for Debbie and her fiancé Bob.

Greg's missing luggage arrives, revealing his real first name as Gaylord, much to the amusement of the Byrnes family. Greg drives sadly to the airport preparing to return to Chicago but is detained by airport security for insisting that his luggage stays with him rather than be checked. Back at the Byrnes's house, Jack learns from a disappointed Pam that he could find no record of Greg from the CIA because his real name is Gaylord, and is presented with copies of Greg's transcripts his parents faxed her, proving that Greg passed the Medical College Admission Test. Despite this, Jack still states his belief that Greg is an unsuitable husband for Pam because of his mistakes and lies, but Dina berates him over his consistent picking apart of any man Pam brings home (and that he didn't even like Pam's previous fiancé, Kevin, until after they broke up).

After hearing Pam make a heartfelt phone call to Greg to apologize for not sticking up for him earlier, Jack realizes that Pam truly loves Greg. He rushes to the airport, convinces airport security to release Greg, and brings him back to the Byrnes's house. Jack performs a lie detector test on Greg to tell the truth about the weekend and loving Pam, leading Jack to propose to Greg to be his son-in-law. As Greg proposes to Pam, Jack and Dina listen in from another room, agreeing that they should now meet Greg's parents despite their worries about doing so. After Debbie's wedding, Jack views footage of Greg recorded by hidden cameras that he had placed strategically around the house, in which Greg calls Jack a "psycho" and mocks him, and also exposes Denny as the true marijuana user.

Cast

Themes

Greg Focker is a middle-class Jewish nurse whose social and cultural position is juxtaposed against the Byrnes family of upper-class White Anglo-Saxon Protestants. With respect to Greg as a Jew and a nurse when compared to the Byrnes and Banks families, a distinct cultural gap is created and subsequently widened. The cultural differences are often highlighted, and Greg repeatedly made aware of them. This serves to achieve comedic effect through character development and has also been commented upon as being indicative of thematic portrayal of Jewish characters' roles in modern film as well as being a prime example of how male nurses are portrayed in media. Speaking about character development in Meet the Parents, director Jay Roach stated that he wanted an opportunity to "do character-driven comedy" and "to create realistic characters, but heighten the comedic situations and predicaments."

Vincent Brook observes mainstream Hollywood cinema's tendency since the 1990s of incorporating Jewish liminality and "popularizing the Jew." He explains the "manly Jewish triumph" of characters like Jeff Goldblum's David Levinson in Independence Day and labels it as a "certain answer to America's yearnings for a new Jewish hero." This stands in direct contrast to the schlemiel or "the Jewish fool" which was seen to have been revitalized in the mid-1990s after faltering since the 1960s. The schlemiel, Brook explains, is an anti-hero in whose humiliation the audience finds supreme pleasure. Within that context, Brook describes Greg Focker's character as "the quintessential example of the postmodern schlemiel." The repeated embarrassing encounters that Greg faces with his girlfriend's all-American family is compared to the example of Jason Biggs's character Jim Levenstein of the American Pie film series where Levenstein is often the comedic centerpiece due to his repeated sexual embarrassments.

Anne Bower writes about Jewish characters at mealtime as part of the broader movement she believes started in the 1960s where filmmakers started producing work that explored the "Jewish self-definition." She postulates that the dinner table becomes an arena where Jewish characters are often and most pointedly put into "conflicts with their ethnic and sexual selves." She describes the example of Greg sitting down for dinner with the Byrnes family and being asked to bless the food. In this scene, Greg attempts to recite a prayer by improvising and, in doing so, launches into a recital of the song "Day by Day" from Act I of Godspell. Bower notes this scene as "particularly important for establishing the cultural distance" between the Jewish Greg and the Christian Byrnes. She noted that the social gap is further widened next morning when Greg is the last person to arrive at the breakfast table; he shows up wearing pajamas while everyone else is fully clothed. Here Greg is shown eating a bagel, which Bower argues as being a clear signifier of Jewishness.

Based on common misconceptions and stereotypes about men in nursing, Greg's profession is repeatedly brought up by Jack in a negative context and the character of Greg Focker has come to be one of the best known film portrayals of a male nurse. Even though men dominated the profession in earlier times, there has been a feminization of the nursing profession over the course of the last century which has caused men in nursing to often be portrayed as misfits by the media. A common stereotype is that of a man who accepts a career in nursing as an unfortunate secondary career choice, either failing to become a physician or still trying to become one. Such stereotyping is due to a presumption that a man would prefer to be a physician but is unable to become one due to lack of intelligence or non-masculine attributes. Jack is often seen openly criticizing Greg's career choice per his perception of nursing being an effeminate profession. In their book Men in Nursing: History, Challenges, and Opportunities authors Chad O'Lynn and Russell Tranbarger present this as an example of a negative portrayal. Commenting on the same issue but disagreeing, Barbara Cherry in her book Contemporary Nursing: Issues, Trends, & Management called the portrayal of Greg as a nurse "one of the most positive film portrayals of men who are nurses" and commented that Greg "humorously addresses and rises above the worst of all stereotypes that are endured by men in this profession." Sandy and Harry Summers in the book Saving Lives: Why the Media's Portrayal of Nurses Puts Us All at Risk postulate that Greg's character, although intelligent and firm in his defense of his profession, "might have done more to rebut the stereotypes" while also reporting that "some men in nursing" expressed their opinions that it would have been better to not present the stereotypes at all.

Production

Background

The film is a remake of a 1992 independent film of the same name. Greg Glienna and Mary Ruth Clarke wrote the original story and screenplay. Glienna also directed and starred in the 76-minute film which was filmed on 16 mm film in 1991 and released the following year. The 1992 film also marked one of only several film roles played by comedian Emo Philips which he also helped produce. Film producer Elliot Grove, founder of Raindance Film Festival and the British Independent Film Awards, listed the original Meet the Parents on his personal Top Ten list of favorite films where he called it "much funnier and tighter than the Hollywood version". The 1992 film was a featured entry in the 1995 Raindance Film Festival.

Producer Nancy Tenenbaum acquired the rights to the 1992 film. After she sent a copy of the original film to several people of interest, filmmaker Steven Soderbergh replied that he was interested and that he wanted to direct a remake. He brought it to the attention of Universal Studios who initially declined but subsequently optioned the rights to the film in 1995. Soderbergh took on the project but then dropped it when he got involved with Out of Sight.

Writing

Universal approached screenwriter Jim Herzfeld to expand the screenplay. Herzfeld expanded the modest script, completing the first draft as early as 1996. He initially presented it to Roach who had, up to that point, directed the first two Austin Powers films. Roach admits to have liked the script from the beginning and was very much willing to make the film even though he thought "it needed more work." Universal initially declined to have relatively inexperienced Roach take on the project. The studio was skeptical of Roach's ability to direct a "less-cartoony, character-driven script" compared to a comedy like Austin Powers. Universal's reluctance to give the project to Roach was also due to new interest from Steven Spielberg who wanted to direct and produce the film with Jim Carrey playing the role of Greg Focker. However, Spielberg and Carrey never took the project past the planning stages. The script was then returned to Roach who had by now taken on his next project of Mystery, Alaska but was still interested in making Meet the Parents.

The drafts of the script were written by Herzfeld and, once De Niro and Stiller were confirmed as stars, John Hamburg was brought on board "to help fit the script to their verbal styles." Due to changes in directorial and acting line-ups after the early drafts of the script were written, Hamburg kept adjusting and re-writing the script well after production had already begun.

Casting

Upon the suggestion of Universal Studios, Roach cast De Niro in the role of Jack Byrnes due to critical acclaim of his recent comedy work in films such as Analyze This and in the live-action/animated film The Adventures of Rocky and Bullwinkle. His character is Pam's father and a retired CIA operative who is overly protective of his family and has a hard time warming up to his daughters' love interests. The script was not written with De Niro in mind as Jack Byrnes; the first draft of the script was completed in 1996, three years before De Niro appeared in Analyze This. However, shortly after De Niro finished filming The Adventures of Rocky and Bullwinkle, Universal suggested to Roach that he should cast him for the role to which Roach agrees that he had "no reservations whatsoever." In an interview with Entertainment Weekly, De Niro stated that he was in active pursuit of comedic roles since Analyze This. Admitting that he had initial reservations about starring in the film, he said that he felt "pushed into it" due to insistence by Jane Rosenthal—De Niro's partner in TriBeCa Productions who also acted as one of the producers. Screenwriter Jim Herzfeld and director Jay Roach both confirmed that, after committing to the project and reviewing the script, De Niro was actually the person who came up with the idea for the famous polygraph test scene. Asked about working with him given the serious nature of his previous roles, Ben Stiller said that "it was a little bit intimidating working with De Niro" but that he "has a great sense of humor and I think that's the biggest surprise about him."

Explaining how Ben Stiller came to be cast in the role of Greg, Roach states: "I saw Meet the Parents as an anxiety dream, and in my view nobody plays that kind of material better than Ben." Additionally, Roach was impressed with Stiller's creative and ad lib abilities stating that "he has lots of great ideas and he's very skilled at loose improvisation." His character is a nurse who loves his girlfriend and tries desperately to impress her parents by any means which includes telling harmless little lies which are then covered up with bigger lies and elaborate cover-up schemes. The film's script was initially written with Jim Carrey in the role of Greg and contained much more physical comedy, something that Stiller did not think would be successful with himself playing the role. This resulted in deletion of some scenes but also in introduction of at least one unscripted scene that was completely improvised by Stiller. Roach cast Stiller only after it became clear that Carrey would not be taking on the role.

The consideration to play the character of Pam Byrnes, Greg's girlfriend who acts as a mediator between Greg and the Byrnes family, especially her father, Jack, was initially given to British actress Naomi Watts. She ultimately lost the role to Teri Polo because the filmmakers "didn't think [Watts] was sexy enough".

Other characters in the film were played by Blythe Danner (as Dina Byrnes, Jack's wife and Pam's mother), Owen Wilson (as Kevin Rawley, Pam's ex-fiancée), Nicole DeHuff (as Debbie Byrnes, Pam's sister), Jon Abrahams (as Denny Byrnes, the youngest child of Jack and Dina Byrnes), Thomas McCarthy (as Bob Banks, Debbie's fiancé), and James Rebhorn (as Larry Banks, Bob Banks' father and a close friend of Jack's). Phyllis George, who is a former Miss Texas and Miss America pageant winner and has appeared on numerous television programs as a guest and a host, made her acting debut as Linda Banks, Larry's wife and Bob's mother.

The role of Jinx the cat was played by two five-year-old Himalayan cats named Bailey and Misha (sometimes written as Meesha). The American Humane Association oversaw the filming of all scenes where the cats were used and ensured the animals' obedience and well-being by keeping two trainers and a veterinarian on set at all times.

Rating
Greg Glienna did not come up with the surname Focker; Greg's character in the original film did not have a last name. The name was written into the script after Jim Carrey came up with the idea for the Focker surname during a creative session held before he abandoned the project. Once Meet the Parents was submitted for rating evaluation, the Motion Picture Association of America (MPAA) questioned the surname Focker as possibly an expletive and, due to the repetitiveness of the surname throughout the film, it was in danger of being rated R according to the Motion Picture Association of America film rating system. The filmmakers were asked if they had made up the name or if they can prove that such a name exists. The studio submitted to the MPAA a list of real people with the surname Focker which ensured that the film retained a PG-13 rating.

Release

Theatrical run
Meet the Parents had its theatrical release in United States and Canada on October 6, 2000. Distributed domestically by Universal Studios, it had an advertising budget of $33.9 million. It quickly proved to be a financial success taking in $28.6 million during its opening weekend and averaging $10,950 per theater in a total of 2,614 theaters. It finished as the top-earning film for the weekend of October 6–8 beating the second-placer Remember the Titans by a margin of over $9 million and bringing in more than four times the earnings of Get Carter, the next highest-earning film released that same weekend. Its opening-weekend earnings were the highest ever for any film released in the month of October, surpassing Antz, as well as marking the highest opening weekend earnings for a film starring Robert De Niro and Ben Stiller, beating Analyze This and The Cable Guy simultaneously. The film's October opening weekend record was later given to Red Dragon in 2002. Its earnings for the second week of release dropped by 26% down to $21.1 million, which still kept it at No.1 at the box office beating Remember the Titans by a margin of over $8 million. By the end of the second week of release, it had already grossed over $58 million, surpassing its production budget of $55 million.
It spent its first four weeks of theatrical release as the highest-grossing film at the U.S. box office, making it the first film to do so since The Sixth Sense in 1999. It was displaced from No.1 during the weekend of November 3–5 by the newly released Charlie's Angels while still managing to stay ahead of The Legend of Bagger Vance, another new release that debuted at number 3. It remained in the Top 10 grossing films until its 11th week. In the United Kingdom, it had its theatrical premiere on December 15, 2000 and was distributed by United International Pictures (UIP). There, it managed to earn over $21 million during its run. In Australia, also being distributed by UIP, it was released on December 26, 2000, where it earned over $11 million during the theatrical run.

Twenty-five weeks after its opening day in North America, Meet the Parents completed its theatrical run on March 29, 2001, grossing $166.2 million in the United States and a total of $330.4 million worldwide, making it the seventh-highest-grossing film of the year both domestically and worldwide.

Home media
The film was released on VHS and DVD on March 6, 2001. The DVD sales for it were successful, taking in over $200 million for 2001. Billboard magazine listed it as having the highest video sales for all weeks from March 31 up to and including April 21, being the top-selling DVD for the weeks of March 24 and March 31, and being the top-rented video for the weeks of April 7 and April 14.

The DVD release provides only the letterbox format of the film and is also 108 minutes in length. The aspect ratio is 1.85:1 with an accommodation for an enhanced 16:9 playback. English-language audio tracks available with the film are a 5.1 Dolby Digital and DTS with the main noticeable difference being only a slightly louder bass on one of the tracks. A French-language audio track is also available only in 5.1 Dolby Digital Format. Additionally, English language subtitles are provided as well.

The single-disc "Collector's Edition" contains two audio commentaries, one a light-hearted and humorous discussion between Roach, Stiller, De Niro, and producer Jane Rosenthal and the other a more formal technical commentary on the film-making aspects by the director and editor Jon Poll. The director discusses issues that include working with the cast, utilizing the best camera angles for comedic effect, discussing scenes that were improvised and scenes that were scripted, and commenting on issues surrounding shooting on location. The editor speaks about putting together the best functioning comedy from material that was filmed and discusses some deleted scenes that were excluded from the DVD release. In addition, the DVD features a twelve-minute outtake section, three minutes of deleted scenes, and Universal's Spotlight on Location featurette. Spotlight on Location is a standard 24-minute-long featurette about the making of the film which includes interviews with the cast members and contains behind-the-scenes footage. It also contains two games called Take The Lie Detector Test and The Forecaster Game as well as PC material such as wallpapers and screensavers. There are also trailers for The Mummy Returns and Captain Corelli's Mandolin. The region 2 edition of the DVD was released on October 22, 2001. A region 1 "Bonus Edition" was released on December 14, 2004 and contains three additional featurettes: Silly Cat Tricks, The Truth About Lying and a 12-minute-long Jay Roach: A Director's Profile.

Soundtrack

The original motion picture soundtrack for the film was released on September 26, 2000 on the DreamWorks Records record label. The soundtrack features 14 original compositions by Randy Newman as well as additional tracks by Bobby Womack, Lee Dorsey, and Dr. John and a hidden bonus track. Newman's original song "A Fool in Love" was nominated for an Academy Award for Best Original Song—Newman's 14th Oscar nomination—at the 73rd Academy Awards but it ultimately lost to Bob Dylan's "Things Have Changed" for Wonder Boys. For the same song, Newman also won the 16th Annual ASCAP Film & Television Music Award in the Top Box Office Films category and was nominated at the 5th Golden Satellite Awards in the Original Song category. Dan Goldwasser, in his review of the soundtrack for Soundtrack.Net, gave credit to Newman and the soundtrack for doing "an excellent job keeping the humor level high."

Reception

Critical reception

Meet the Parents received a generally positive response from film critics, being commended on the subtlety of its humor as well as being named as "the funniest" or "one of the funniest" films of the year by several critics.   Audiences polled by CinemaScore gave the film an average rating of "A−" on an A+ to F scale.

Kenneth Turan, film critic for Los Angeles Times, called it "the funniest film of the year so far, possibly the most amusing mainstream live-action comedy since There's Something About Mary." Critic Joe Morgenstern of The Wall Street Journal stated that the film "does almost everything right with a story about everything going wrong" and that it "works up a major comic delirium on the theme of Murphy's Law", concluding that "Meet the Parents is the funniest movie of the year." CNN's Paul Clinton proclaimed "Meet the Parents is one of the best comedies of this—or any other—year", calling it "wonderfully funny" and expressing his hope that "the Academy will also recognize this wonderful movie, something it rarely does when it comes to comedies." Time magazine's film critic Richard Schickel stated that it was "divinely invented and perfectly orchestrated". He complimented the screenplay by calling the screenwriters Jim Herzfeld and John Hamburg "a couple of skilled tool-and-die makers" as well as the acting cast because he believed that they "understand that palpable reality will always trump frenzied fantasy when it comes to getting laughs." Schickel concluded his review by proclaiming Meet the Parents a "superbly antic movie". Todd McCarthy of Variety magazine called the film "flat-out hilarious" and Neil Smith of BBC proclaimed that "there's not a weak scene in this super-funny picture" while awarding it a rating of five stars out of five. Film critic Roger Ebert of the Chicago Sun-Times gave it three stars out of four comparing it to Roach's previous work on the Austin Powers film series and offering his opinion that "[Meet the Parents] is funnier because it never tries too hard." Critic Christopher Null of AMC's Filmcritic.com claimed that "Meet the Parents is one of the funniest comedies I've seen since Annie Hall". Lisa Schwarzbaum from Entertainment Weekly called the script "unforced" and concluded that it "goes down like a flute of Champagne, leaving an aftertaste of giggles."

However, Internet film critic James Berardinelli, in spite of awarding it two-and-a-half stars out of four, gave the film a somewhat scathing review. On his website, Berardinelli wrote that "Meet the Parents is put together like a TV sit-com," that Roach "strings together a series of hit-and-miss lowbrow gags with little care for whether any of the connecting material is coherent, interesting, or enjoyable (in most cases, it's none of those three)" and concluding that "even with Stiller and De Niro, Meet the Parents is an encounter that can be postponed until it's available on video." Jeff Vice of the Deseret News, another detractor of the film, proclaimed Meet the Parents "only erratically funny" and accused Roach of taking "the cheap way out with a series of unfunny jokes." Critic Peter Bradshaw's review of it in The Guardian concludes that "It is somehow less than the sum of its parts. It strains to come to life, but never quite makes it." After it was released on home media, DVD reviewer and Rolling Stone magazine contributor Douglas Pratt in his book Doug Pratt's DVD: Movies, Television, Music, Art, Adult, and More! stated that "perhaps in the crowded theater the film is hysterical, but in the quieter venue of home video, it just seems sadistic, and as the humor evaporates, the holes in the plot become clearer."

Accolades

Others
The film is recognized by American Film Institute in these lists:
 2005: AFI's 100 Years ... 100 Movie Quotes:
 Jack Byrnes: "I have nipples, Greg. Could you milk me?" – Nominated

Influence
The success of the film was initially responsible for a 2002 NBC reality television show entitled Meet My Folks in which a young woman's love interest, vying for her family's approval, is interrogated by the woman's overprotective father with the help of a lie detector machine. In September 2002, NBC also aired a situation comedy entitled In-Laws. During the development of it, NBC called it "a Meet the Parents project" which prompted an investigation by Universal into whether NBC was infringing on Universal's copyright. Universal did not pursue any action against NBC but neither show lasted more than one season. NBC and Universal would merge in 2004.

In 2004, Meet the Fockers was released as a sequel to the film. Directed again by Jay Roach with a screenplay by Jim Herzfeld and John Hamburg, it chronicles the events that take place when the Byrnes family meets Bernie and Roz Focker, Greg's parents, played by Dustin Hoffman and Barbra Streisand. The producers intended for them to be the opposite of the Byrneses' conservative, upper class, WASPy demeanor; to that effect, producer Jane Rosenthal explains that "Dustin Hoffman and Barbra Streisand were our dream team." The sequel proved to be another financial success grossing $280 million domestically and $516 million worldwide, outperforming Meet the Parents by a large margin and finishing as the fourth-highest-grossing film of 2004.

In February 2007, Universal Studios announced that they would be making a second sequel in the franchise, titled Little Fockers. It was to be directed by Roach with the screenplay written by Larry Stuckey, Roach's former assistant. The sequel brings back De Niro, Stiller, Polo, Danner, Hoffman, and Streisand. Roach was later replaced as director of the third film by Paul Weitz. Little Fockers was released in 2010 and grossed $148.4 million domestically and $310.7 million worldwide.

On July 18, 2005, a regularly scheduled American Airlines flight from Fort Lauderdale–Hollywood International Airport to San Juan, Puerto Rico had to be diverted back to Fort Lauderdale shortly after take-off due to a bomb threat. The pilot turned the plane around approximately 40 minutes into the flight after a flight attendant found a crumpled napkin that read "Bomb, bomb, bomb...meet the parents," a clear reference to the scene in which Greg repeatedly shouts the word "bomb" while being detained by airport security. The plane was met by a bomb squad of the local sheriff's office as well as the FBI whose agents questioned its 176 passengers about the note.

See also
 2000 in film
 Cinema of the United States
 List of American films of 2000

References

Further reading

External links

  (Archived)
 
 
 
 
 
 

2000 films
American comedy films
2000s American films
2000s English-language films
2000 comedy films
Films about weddings in the United States
Films set in New York (state)
Films set in Chicago
Films shot in New York (state)
American interfaith romance films
Midlife crisis films
Remakes of American films
Films scored by Randy Newman
Films with screenplays by John Hamburg
Films produced by Robert De Niro
Films directed by Jay Roach
Universal Pictures films
DreamWorks Pictures films